Anne-Marie Lousteau (born 16 October 1932) is a French sprinter. She competed in the women's 200 metres at the 1952 Summer Olympics.

References

External links
 

1932 births
Living people
Athletes (track and field) at the 1952 Summer Olympics
French female sprinters
Olympic athletes of France
Place of birth missing (living people)
Olympic female sprinters